Circassian beauty or Adyghe beauty is a stereotype and a belief referring to the Circassian people. A fairly extensive literary history suggests that Circassian women were thought to be unusually beautiful and attractive, spirited, smart and elegant, and as such were desirable (although most Circassians refuse to marry non-Circassians, a requirement of Adyghe Xabze). A similar yet smaller literature also exists for Circassian men, who were thought to be especially handsome.

There are folk songs in various languages all around the Middle East and Balkans describing the unusual beauty of Circassian women, a trend popularised after the Circassian genocide, although the reputation of Circassian women dates back to the Late Middle Ages when the Circassian coast was frequented by traders from Genoa, and the founder of the Medici dynasty, Cosimo de' Medici, had an illegitimate son from a Circassian slave. During the Ottoman Empire and Persian Safavid and Qajar dynasties, Circassian women living as slaves in the Sultan's Imperial Harem and Shah's harems started to build their reputation as extremely beautiful, which then became a common trope in Western Orientalism.

As a result of this reputation, in Europe and America Circassians were often characterised as ideals of feminine beauty in poetry and art. Cosmetic products were advertised, from the 18th century on, using the word "Circassian" in the title, or claiming that the product was based on substances used by the women of Circassia.

In consequence, most wives and mothers of several Ottoman Sultans were ethnic Circassians, including Perestü Valide Sultan, Şevkefza Valide Sultan, Tirimüjgan Valide Sultan, Nükhetseza Başhanımefendi, Şemsiruhsar Hatun, Saçbağlı Sultan, Hümaşah Haseki Sultan, Hatice Muazzez Haseki Sultan, Ayşe Haseki Sultan, Bedrifelek I, Bidar II, Kamures I, Servetseza I, Bezmara VI, Düzdidil III, Hayranıdil II, Meyliservet IV, Mihrengiz II, Neşerek III, Nurefsun II, Reftaridil II, Şayan III, amongst many others. İkbals (honoured lady consorts) of Circassian descent were also numerous, most notable of them being Cevherriz II, Ceylanyar II, Dilfirib I, Nalanıdil III, and Nergis IV in addition to Gözdes (favourite lady consorts), including Dürdane I, Hüsnicenan III, Safderun IV, amongst others. The "golden age" of the Circassian beauty may be considered to be between the 1770s, when the Russian Empire seized the Crimean Khanate and cut off their slave trade, which increased the demand for Circassian women in Near Eastern harems; and the 1860s, when the Russians massacred thousands of Circassians and conquered Circassia. After 1854, almost all Ottoman harem concubines were of Circassian origin; the Circassians had been expelled from Russian lands in the 1860s and the improverished refugee parents sold their daughters in a trade that was formally banned, but tolerated.

In the 1860s the showman P. T. Barnum exhibited women who he claimed were Circassian beauties. They wore a distinctive curly, big hair style, which had no precedent in earlier portrayals of Circassians, but which was soon copied by other female performers in the United States, who became known as "moss-haired girls". This hair style was a sort of exhibit's trademark and was achieved by washing the hair of women in beer, drying it and then teasing it. It is not clear why Barnum chose this hairstyle. It may have been a reference to the Circassian fur hat, rather than the hair.

There were also several classical Turkish music pieces and poems that praise the beauty of the Circassian ethnic group like "Lepiska Saçlı Çerkes" (Straight, flaxen-haired Circassian; "lepiska" refers to long blonde hair which is straight, as if flatironed).

Literary allusions

The legend of Circassian women in the western world was enhanced in 1734, when, in his Letters on the English, Voltaire alludes to the beauty of Circassian women:

Their beauty is mentioned in Henry Fielding's Tom Jones (1749), in which Fielding remarked, "How contemptible would the brightest Circassian beauty, drest in all the jewels of the Indies, appear to my eyes!"

Similar claims about Circassian women appear in Lord Byron's Don Juan (1818–1824), in which the tale of a slave auction is told:

The legend of Circassian women was also repeated by legal theorist Gustav Hugo, who wrote that "Even beauty is more likely to be found in a Circassian slave girl than in a beggar girl", referring to the fact that even a slave has some security and safety, but a "free" beggar has none. Hugo's comment was later condemned by Karl Marx in The Philosophical Manifesto of the Historical School of Law (1842) on the grounds that it excused slavery. Mark Twain reported in The Innocents Abroad (1869) that "Circassian and Georgian girls are still sold in Constantinople, but not publicly."

American travel author and diplomat Bayard Taylor in 1862 claimed that, "So far as female beauty is concerned, the Circassian women have no superiors. They have preserved in their mountain home the purity of the Grecian models, and still display the perfect physical loveliness, whose type has descended to us in the Venus de' Medici."

Circassian features

Circassian women

An anthropological literary suggests that Circassians were best characterized by what was called "rosy pale" or "translucent white skin". While most Circassian tribes were famous for abundance of fair or dark blond and red hair combined with greyish-blue or green eyes, many also had the pairing of very dark hair with very light complexions, a typical feature of Peoples of the Caucasus. Many of the Circassian women in the Ottoman harem were described as having "green eyes and long, dark blond hair, pale skin of translucent white colour, thin waist, slender body structure, and very good-looking hands and feet". The fact that Circassian women were traditionally encouraged to wear corsets in order to keep their posture straight might have shaped their wasp waist as a result. In the late 18th century, it was claimed by Western European couturiers that "the Circassian Corset is the only one which displays, without indelicacy, the shape of the bosom to the greatest possible advantage; gives a width to the chest which is equally conducive to health and elegance of appearance".

It has also been suggested that a lithe and erect physique were favored for Circassians, and many villages had large numbers of healthy elderly people, many over a hundred years of age.

Maturin Murray Ballou described Circassians as being of the "fair and rosy-cheeked race", and "with a form of ravishing loveliness, large and lustrous eyes, and every belonging that might go to make up a Venus".

In Henry Lindlahr's words in the early 20th century, "Blue-eyed Caucasian regiments today form the cream of the Sultan's army. Circassian beauties are admired for their abundant and luxuriant yellow hair and blue eyes."

In his book A Year Among the Circassians, John Augustus Longworth describes a Circassian girl of typical Circassian features as the following: "She had regular and pretty features, blue eyes, and fair complexion; her hair was of a light auburn colour, and hung in a profusion of braided tresses over her shoulders, from a bonnet of scarlet cloth, trimmed and crossed with broad silver lace, not unlike the Albanian skull-cap. She was tall, and well, though slightly, shaped; and held herself, like all Circassians, men or women, very erect."

It is also understood from the memoirs of Princess Emily Ruete, a half-Circassian and half-Omani herself, that Circassian women, who were captured in Constantinople and brought to Africa for the harem of Zanzibari Said bin Sultan, Sultan of Muscat and Oman, were envied by their rivals who considered Circassians to be of the "hateful race of blue-eyed cats".

Regarding one of her half-sisters who was also from a Circassian mother, Princess Ruete of Zanzibar mentions that "The daughter of a Circassian was a dazzling beauty with the complexion of a German blonde. Besides, she possessed a sharp intellect, which made her into a faithful advisor of my father's."

The characteristics of Circassian and Georgian women were further articulated in 1839 by the author Emma Reeve who, as stated by Joan DelPlato, differentiated "between 'the blond Circassians' who are 'indolent and graceful, their voices low and sweet' and what she calls the slightly darker-skinned Georgians who are 'more animated' and have more 'intelligence and vivacity than their delicate rivals.

Similar descriptions of the Circassian women appear in Florence Nightingale's travel journal where Nightingale called Circassians "the most graceful and the most sensual-looking creatures I ever saw".

According to the feminist Harriet Martineau, Circassians were the only saving virtue of the Egyptian harem where these Circassian mothers produced the finest children and if they were to be excluded from the harem, the upper class in Egypt would be doomed.

In parts of Europe and North America where blond hair was more common, the pairing of extremely white skin with very dark hair also present among some Circassians was exalted, even in Russia which was at war with the Circassians; Semyon Bronevskii exalted Circassian women for having light skin, dark brown hair, dark eyes and "the lineaments of the face of the Ancient Greek". In the United States, the girls disguised as "Circassians" exhibited by Phineas T. Barnum were in fact Catholic Irish girls from Lower Manhattan.

Circassian men
Circassian men were also exalted for their beauty, manliness and bravery in Western Europe, in a way Caucasus historian Charles King calls "homoerotic". In Scotland, in 1862, Circassian chiefs arrived to advocate their cause against Russia and to persuade Britain to stop the actions of the Russian army at that time, and upon the arrival of two Circassian leaders, Hadji Hayder Hassan and Kustan Ogli Ismael, the Dundee Advertiser reported that "the Chiefs are two remarkable looking men. Their imposing bearing, their romantic dress ... and their natural dignity of mien, stamp them as very superior ... Raven haired, black-bearded, broad-browed, with wide springing eyebrows of sooty black ... these bronzed and armed children of the mountains tend to put us out of love with our own specimens of men, and suggests thoughts not complementary to the types of manhood which, in this country, they are surrounded."

Pseudoscientific explanations for fair skin
During the 19th century, various Western intellectuals offered pseudoscientific explanations for the light complexion present among Circassians. The doctor of medicine Hugh Williamson, a signatory to the United States Constitution, argued that the reason for the extreme whiteness of the Circassian and coastal Celto-Germanic peoples can be explained by the geographical location of these folks' ancestral homelands which lie in high latitudes ranging from 45° to 55° N near a sea or ocean where westerlies prevail from the west towards the east.

According to Voltaire, the practice of inoculation (see also variolation, an early form of vaccination) resulted in the Circassians having skin clean of smallpox scars:

Pseudoscientific racialist theories
By the early nineteenth century, Circassians were associated with theories of racial hierarchy, which elevated the Caucasus region as the source of the purest examples of the "white race", which was named the Caucasian race after the area by Johann Friedrich Blumenbach. Blumenbach theorised that the Circassians were the closest to God's original model of humanity, and thus "the purest and most beautiful whites were the Circassians". This fuelled the idea of female Circassian beauty.

In 1873, the decade after the expulsion of Circassians from the Caucasus where only a minority of them live today, it was argued that "the Caucasian Race receives its name from the Caucasus, the abode of the Circassians who are said to be the handsomest and best-formed nation, not only of this race, but of the whole human family." Another anthropologist, William Guthrie, distinguished the Caucasian race and the "Circassians who are admired for their beauty" in particular by their oval form of their head, straight nose, thin lips, vertically-placed teeth, facial angle from 80 to 90 degrees that he calls the most developed one, and their regular features overall, which "causes them to be considered as the most handsome and agreeable".

Bayard Taylor observed the Circassian women during his trip to the Ottoman Empire and argued that "the Circassian face is a pure oval; the forehead is low and fair, an excellent thing in woman, and the skin of an ivory whiteness, except the faint pink of the cheeks and the ripe, roseate stain of the lips."

Circassians are depicted in images of harems at this time through these ideologies of racial hierarchy. John Frederick Lewis's The Harem portrays Circassians as the dominant mistresses of the harem, who look down on other women, as implied in the review of the painting in The Art Journal, which described it as follows:

It represents the interior of a harem and slaves at Cairo, wherein is seated in luxurious ease a young man, attired in the excess of Moslem fashion. Near him, and reclining upon cushions, are two European Circassian women, whom also dressed in the extremity of Egyptian Oriental taste of Cairo ... On the right is seen a tall Nubian eunuch, who removes from the shoulders of an African Black slave the shawl by which she had been covered, in order to show her to the master of the harem; this figure with her high shoulders and the characteristics of her features, is a most successful national impersonation. The Circassian women look languidly to the African with an expression of supreme contempt, which is responded to by a sneer on the face of the Nubian eunuch.

Orientalizing paintings of nudes were also sometimes exhibited as "Circassians".

The Circassians became major news during the Caucasian War, in which Russia conquered the North Caucasus, displacing large numbers of Circassians southwards. In 1856 The New York Times published a report entitled "Horrible Traffic in Circassian Women – Infanticide in Turkey", asserting that a consequence of the Russian conquest of the Caucasus was an excess of beautiful Circassian women on the Constantinople slave market, and that this was causing prices of slaves in general to plummet. The story drew on ideas of racial hierarchy, stating that:

The temptation to possess a Circassian girl at such low prices is so great in the minds of the Turks that many who cannot afford to keep several slaves have been sending their blacks to market, in order to make room for a newly purchased white girl.

The article also claimed that children born to the "inferior" black concubines were being killed. This story drew widespread attention to the area, as did later conflicts.

At the same time writers and illustrators were also creating images depicting the authentic costumes and people of the Caucasus. Francis Davis Millet depicted Circassian women during his 1877 coverage of the Russo-Turkish war, specifying local costume and hairstyle.

Advertising of beauty products

An advertisement from 1782 titled "Bloom of Circassia" makes clear that it was by then well established "that the Circassians are the most beautiful Women in the World", but goes on to reveal that they "derive not all their Charms from Nature". They used a concoction supposedly extracted from a vegetable native to Circassia. Knowledge of this "Liquid Bloom" had been brought back by a "well-regarded gentleman" who had traveled and lived in the region. It "instantly gives a Rosy Hue to the Cheeks", a "lively and animated Bloom of Rural Beauty" that would not disappear in perspiration or handkerchiefs.

In 1802 "the Balm of Mecca" was also marketed as being used by Circassians: 
"This delicate as well as fragrant composition has been long celebrated as the summit of cosmetics by all the Circassian and Georgian women in the seraglio of the Grand Sultan". It claims that the product was endorsed by Lady Mary Wortley Montague who stated that it was very helpful "for removing those sebacious impurities so noxious to beauty". The article continues:

"Circassian Lotion" was sold in 1806 for the skin, at fifty cents the bottle.

"Circassian Eye-Water" was marketed as "a sovereign remedy for all diseases of the eyes", and in the 1840s "Circassian hair dye" was marketed to create a rich dark lustrous effect.

Nineteenth-century sideshow attraction

The combination of the popular issues of slavery, the Orient, racial ideology, and sexual titillation gave the reports of Circassian women sufficient notoriety at the time that the circus leader P. T. Barnum decided to capitalize on this interest. He displayed a "Circassian Beauty" at his American Museum in 1865. Barnum's Circassian beauties were young women with tall, teased hairstyles, rather like the Afro style of the 1970s. Actual Circassian hairstyles bore no resemblance to Barnum's fantasy. Barnum's first "Circassian" was marketed under the name "Zalumma Agra" and was exhibited at his American Museum in New York from 1864. Barnum had written to John Greenwood, his agent in Europe, asking him to purchase a beautiful Circassian girl to exhibit, or at least to hire a girl who could "pass for" one. However, it seems that "Zalumma Agra" was probably a local girl hired by the show, as were later "Circassians". Barnum also produced a booklet about another of his Circassians, Zoe Meleke, who was portrayed as an ideally beautiful and refined woman who had escaped a life of sexual slavery.

The portrayal of a white woman as a rescued slave at the time of the American Civil War played on the racial connotations of slavery at the time. It has been argued that the distinctive hairstyle affiliates the side-show Circassian with African identity, and thus,

resonates oddly yet resoundingly with the rest of her identifying significations: her racial purity, her sexual enslavement, her position as colonial subject; her beauty. The Circassian blended elements of white Victorian True Womanhood with traits of the enslaved African American woman in one curiosity.

The trend spread, with supposedly Circassian women featured in dime museums and travelling medicine shows, sometimes known as "Moss-haired girls". They were typically identified by the distinctive hairstyle, which was held in place by the use of beer. They also often performed in pseudo-oriental costume. Many postcards of Circassians also circulated. Though Barnum's original women were portrayed as proud and genteel, later images of Circassians often emphasised erotic poses and revealing costumes. As the original fad faded, the "Circassians" started to add to their appeal by performing traditional circus tricks such as sword swallowing.

In popular culture
The Safety Fire, British progressive metal band, released their song "Circassian Beauties" in 2012.
The American alternative rock band Monks of Doom released another song with the title "Circassian Beauty" in their 1991 album Meridian.

See also
 Barbary corsairs
 Ottoman Imperial Harem
 La Circassienne au Bain, 1814 painting by Merry-Joseph Blondel; famously lost with the Titanic

References

Further reading
 Natalia Królikowska-Jedlinska. 2020. "The Role of Circassian Slaves in the Foreign and Domestic Policy of the Crimean Khanate in the Early Modern Period." in Slaves and Slave Agency in the Ottoman Empire, edited by Stephan Conermann, Gül Şen. V&R unipress and Bonn University Press.

External links

The Circassian Beauty Archive
Circassian Women, from showhistory.com

Circassians
Corsetry
Female beauty
Medieval ethnic groups of Europe
Orientalism
Ottoman imperial harem
Physical attractiveness
Qajar harem
Race and society
Royal consorts
Safavid imperial harem
Scientific racism
Sexual slavery
Stereotypes of white people
Women in art